Brachioteuthis picta is a species of squid in the family Brachioteuthidae.

References 

Animals described in 1910
Squid